Palmadusta contaminata is a species of sea snail, a cowry, a marine gastropod mollusk in the family Cypraeidae, the cowries.

Subspecies 
Palmadusta contaminata contaminata (Sowerby I, 1832)
Palmadusta contaminata distans Schilder

Description

Distribution
This species occurs in the Indian Ocean along the Mascarene Basin, Mauritius, Réunion and Tanzania.

References

External links

Cypraeidae
Gastropods described in 1832